Arturo Uslar Pietri (16 May 1906 in Caracas – 26 February 2001) was a Venezuelan intellectual, historian, writer, television producer, and politician.

Life 
Born on 16 May 1906 in Caracas, Venezuela, his parents were general Arturo Uslar Santamaría and Helena Pietri de Uslar.

The last name Uslar is of German origin and can be traced back to Johann von Uslar, who fought for the rebel cause during Venezuela's independence wars. As a young boy and then teenager he lived in various cities in the comparatively urbanised central northern valleys of the country. He moved back to Caracas in 1924 to read political sciences at the Central University of Venezuela, where he graduated Doctor of Political Sciences in 1929. That same year he obtained a law degree.

Uslar led a remarkably fruitful life, influential in Venezuelan politics, historical analysis and literature, and as an educator. His period of activity spanned the last years of Venezuelan Caudillismo, the transition to democracy and most of the democratic era of 1958 - 1999. He held posts such as Secretary for the Venezuelan Delegation at the League of Nations, delegate at the International Labour Organization, minister of education, minister of finance, contributor to the Act of Constitution of the New Democratic Government (1958), ambassador to the United States, professor of Latin American literature at Columbia University, professor of political economics at the Central University of Venezuela, chief editor of a main newspaper, candidate for the Presidency and member of the Royal Spanish Academy.

Uslar Pietri had a lifetime involvement in the Venezuelan media as a cultural figure. He wrote regionally influential essays and novels, of which The Red Lances, an account of life during the Venezuelan War of Independence from various social perspectives is arguably the most famous. In his works he championed mestizaje, or miscegenation, as a valuable feature of Latin American culture. His literary output was recognised in 1990 with a Prince of Asturias Award. He was several times nominated for the Nobel Prize in Literature.

Uslar Pietri died on 26 February 2001 in Caracas. He had announced his retirement as an author in 1998 and last figured prominently in political debate in 1993.

Awards
El Nacional Best Short Story Award (1949)
National Prize for Literature (1954 and 1982)
National Journalism Award (1971)
The Miguel de Cervantes Hispanic-American Journalism Award (1972)
Prince of Asturias Award (1990)
Légion d'honneur Grand-Croix (Grand Cross) (1990)
Rómulo Gallegos Prize for Best Novel (1991)

Works

Novels

(1931) Las lanzas coloradas.
(1947) El camino de El Dorado.
(1962) Un retrato en la geografía.
(1964) Estación de máscaras.
(1976) Oficio de difuntos.
(1981) La isla de Robinson.
(1990) La visita en el tiempo.

Essays
(1945) Las visiones del camino.
(1945) Sumario de economía venezolana para alivio de estudiantes.
(1948) Letras y hombres de Venezuela.
(1949) De una a otra Venezuela.
(1951) Las nubes.
(1952) Apuntes para retratos.
(1953) Tierra venezolana.
(1954) Tiempo de contar.
(1955) El petróleo en Venezuela.
(1955) Pizarrón.
(1955-56-58) Valores humanos.
(1955) Breve historia de la novela hispanoamericana.

(1959) Materiales para la construcción de Venezuela.
(1962) Del hacer y deshacer de Venezuela.
(1964) Valores humanos. Biografías y evocaciones.
(1964) La palabra compartida. Discursos en el Parlamento (1959–1963).
(1965) Hacia el humanismo democrático.
(1966) Petróleo de vida o muerte.
(1967) Oraciones para despertar.
(1968) Las vacas gordas y las vacas flacas.
(1969) En busca del nuevo mundo.
(1971) Vista desde un punto.
(1972) Bolivariana.
(1974) La otra América.
(1975) Camino de cuento.
(1975) Viva voz.
(1979) Fantasmas de dos mundos.
(1981) Cuéntame a Venezuela.
(1981) Educar para Venezuela.
(1982) Fachas, fechas y fichas.
(1983) Bolívar hoy.
(1984) Venezuela en el petróleo.
(1986) Medio milenio de Venezuela.
(1986) Raíces venezolanas.
(1986) Bello el venezolano.
(1986) Godos, insurgentes y visionarios.
(1990) La creación del Nuevo Mundo.
(1992) Golpe y Estado en Venezuela.
(1994) Del cerro de plata al camino extraviado.

Short stories
(1928) Barrabás y otros relatos.
(1936) Red.

(1949) Treinta hombres y sus sombras.
(1966) Pasos y Pasajeros.
(1967) La lluvia y otros cuentos.
(1980) Los Ganadores.

Poetry
(1972) Manoa: 1932–1972.
(1986) El hombre que voy siendo.

Theater
(1958) El día de Antero Alban. La Tebaida. El Dios invisible. La fuga de Miranda.
(1960) Chuo Gil y las tejedoras. Drama en un preludio y siete tiempos.

Travel
(1950) La ciudad de nadie.
(1954) El otoño en Europa.
(1955) Un turista en el cercano oriente.
(1960) La ciudad de nadie. El otoño en Europa. Un turista en el cercano oriente.
(1971) La vuelta al mundo en diez trancos.
(1975) El globo de colores.

References

External links 
  Uslar Pietri at Cervantes Virtual
  Sembrar el Petróleo, 1936
  Essays by and about Uslar Pietri
  Fundación Casa Arturo Uslar Pietri

1906 births
2001 deaths
20th-century male writers
20th-century novelists
20th-century Venezuelan novelists
Central University of Venezuela alumni
Academic staff of the Central University of Venezuela
Columbia University faculty
Finance ministers of Venezuela
Grand Croix of the Légion d'honneur
Maria Moors Cabot Prize winners
Magic realism writers
Male novelists
Members of the Senate of Venezuela
People from Caracas
Venezuelan diplomats
Venezuelan literary critics
Venezuelan male writers
Venezuelan people of Corsican descent
Venezuelan people of German descent
Death in Caracas
Education ministers of Venezuela
Secretariat of the Presidency ministers of Venezuela